Dagnė Čiukšytė (born 1 January 1977) is a Lithuanian chess player. In 2007 she moved to England and now represents this country in international competitions.

Lithuania from 1994 to 2006 
Dagnė Čiukšytė has been a professional chess player since she made her debut in 1994 for Lithuania. In 1994, she went on to win the Lithuanian women's championship. She repeated the same feat in 1996, 1997 and in 2003. Čiukšytė also represented Lithuania in five Women's Chess Olympiads from 1994 to 2006. Čiukšytė competed at the 1995 Women's Interzonal tournament, held in Chişinău, and at the 2001 Women's World Championship.

Čiukšytė competed in the EU Individual Championship in 2006 and finished as the highest ranked female player on 6½ points.

In 1995, she was awarded the title of Woman International Master by FIDE, which was followed by that of Woman Grandmaster in 2002. In 2006 Čiukšytė also received the title of International Master.

England from 2007 to present 
She left Lithuania and moved to England to represent the English national chess team. Čiukšytė shared first place with Guliskhan Nakhbayeva at the women's invitational tournament of the 2011 London Chess Classic festival.

Personal life 
Her younger sister, Živilė Šarakauskienė, is also a chess player who was national women's champion of Lithuania in 2002, 2009, and 2011.

See also 
List of female chess players
List of nationality transfers in chess

References

External links 

Dagne Ciuksyte games at 365chess.com
Dagne Ciuksyte games and profile at Chess-DB.com
Dagne Ciuksyte Dagne Ciuksyte's website

1977 births
Living people
Lithuanian female chess players
English female chess players
Chess International Masters
Chess woman grandmasters
People from Panevėžys
Chess Olympiad competitors